Loxostege clathralis is a species of moth in the family Crambidae. It is found from Europe (Croatia, Romania, Ukraine and Russia), through Central Asia (including Kazakhstan) to China.

References

Moths described in 1813
Pyraustinae
Moths of Europe
Moths of Asia